Aquae in Proconsulari is a former Ancient city and bishopric in Roman Africa and present Latin Catholic titular see.

Its modern location is Henchir-El-Baghla, in present Tunisia.

History 
Aquae Novae was important enough in the Roman province of Africa Proconsularis to become one of the many suffragans of its capital Carthage's Metropolitan Archbishopric, but faded.

Titular see 
The diocese was nominally restored in 1933 as a titular bishopric.

It has had the following incumbents, all of the lowest (episcopal) rank :
 José Fernandes Veloso (1966.03.23 – 1981.11.26), as Auxiliary Bishop of Roman Catholic Diocese of Petropolis (Brazil) (1966.03.23 – 1981.11.26), later promoted Coadjutor Bishop of Petrópolis (1981.11.26 – 1984.02.15) and succeeding as Bishop of Petrópolis (1984.02.15 – 1995.11.15)
 Salim Sayegh (1981.11.26 – ...), Auxiliary Bishop emeritus of the Latin Patriarchate of Jerusalem (Palestine, Holy Land)

See also 
 Aquae in Numidia
 Aquae Novae in Proconsulari
 Catholic Church in Tunisia

References 

Catholic titular sees in Africa